Eacles barnesi is a moth of the  family Saturniidae. It is found in South America, including French Guiana, Brazil and Peru.

External links
 Images

Ceratocampinae
Moths described in 1905